Djevdet Shainoski (Macedonian: Џевдет Шаиноски; born 8 June 1973 in Ohrid) is a Macedonian football midfielder and manager, currently in charge of Farum Boldklub, the second team of FC Nordsjælland.

International career
He made his senior debut for Macedonia in a March 1997 friendly match against Australia and has earned a total of 26 caps, scoring 2 goals. His final international was a March 2002 friendly against Bosnia and Herzegovina.

International goals

References

External links
 Profile at MacedonianFootball.com 
 

1973 births
Living people
Sportspeople from Ohrid
Association football midfielders
Macedonian footballers
North Macedonia international footballers
FK Tikvesh players
FK Vardar players
NEC Nijmegen players
Hannover 96 players
Boldklubben af 1893 players
FC Nordsjælland players
Ølstykke FC players
Macedonian First Football League players
Eredivisie players
2. Bundesliga players
Danish 1st Division players
Danish Superliga players
Macedonian expatriate footballers
Expatriate footballers in the Netherlands
Macedonian expatriate sportspeople in the Netherlands
Expatriate footballers in Germany
Macedonian expatriate sportspeople in Germany
Expatriate men's footballers in Denmark
Macedonian expatriate sportspeople in Denmark
Expatriate footballers in Sweden
Macedonian expatriate sportspeople in Sweden
AB Tårnby players